The 1978 Michigan Secretary of State election was held on November 7, 1978. Incumbent Democrat Richard H. Austin defeated Republican nominee Melvin L. Larsen with 65.57% of the vote.

Larsen conceded the election early, before 10% of the return votes were counted.

General election

Candidates
Major party candidates
Richard H. Austin, Democratic
Melvin L. Larsen, Republican

Results

References

1978 Michigan elections
Michigan Secretary of State elections
Michigan
November 1978 events in the United States